Natko ( is a Croatian male given name. Notable people with the surname include:

 Natko Devčić (1914–1997), Croatian composer
 Natko Nodilo (1834–1912), Croatian politician and historian
 Natko Rački (born 1981), former Croatian footballer
 Natko Zrnčić-Dim (born 1986), Croatian alpine ski racer

given names
Masculine given names
Croatian masculine given names